The 2019 League of Ireland Premier Division is the 35th season of the League of Ireland Premier Division. The league began in February 2019 and concluded in October 2019. Fixtures were announced in December 2018.

On 23 September, Dundalk won the title after a 3–2 win over Shamrock Rovers.

Overview
The Premier Division consists of 10 teams. Each team plays each other four times for 36 matches in the season.

UCD, the 2018 First Division champion, were promoted to the league for the first time since 2014, and Finn Harps, winners of the promotion/relegation playoffs, were promoted to the league, returning after the absence in the previous season.

Teams

Stadia and locations

Personnel and kits

Note: Flags indicate national team as has been defined under FIFA eligibility rules. Players may hold more than one non-FIFA nationality.

Managerial changes

League table

Results

Matches 1–18
Teams played each other twice (once at home, once away).

Matches 19–36
Teams will play each other twice (once home, once away).

Promotion/relegation playoff
Finn Harps, who finished ninth in the Premier Division, faced the First Division's Drogheda United to determine which club would participate in the 2020 Premier Division.

Season statistics

Top scorers

Awards

Player of the Month

Annual awards

See also
 2019 League of Ireland First Division
 2019 FAI Cup
 2019 League of Ireland Cup

References

External links
 Official website
 Full Results and Fixtures

 
1
League of Ireland Premier Division seasons
1
Ireland
Ireland